Elizabeth Akosua Tiwaah Dwomoh is a Belgian beauty pageant titleholder who was crowned as Miss Earth Belgium 2015 and Belgium's representative in Miss Earth 2015. She was crowned by Miss Exclusive 2014, Emily Vanhoutte.

Pageantry

Miss Exclusive 2015
Elizabeth joined the Miss Exclusive 2015 and she was proclaimed as the winner. Her runners up include Axelle Stratsaert as the first runner up while Amy De Paepe was declared second runner-up.

Elizabeth won € 75,000, including a new Fiat 500.

Miss Earth 2015
As the winner of Miss Exclusive, Elizabeth is automatically the Miss Earth Belgium as well. As part of her responsibilities, Elizabeth is Belgium's representative to be Miss Earth 2015 and succeeds Jamie Herrell in Vienna, Austria.

References

Miss Earth 2015 contestants
Belgian beauty pageant winners
Living people
1995 births
Models from Brussels
Belgian people of Ghanaian descent